Hendrik Somaeb (born 29 September 1992) is a Namibian international footballer who plays for Zambia Super League giants Lusaka Dynamos F.C.

Club career
Born in the Namibian coastal city of Walvis Bay in 1992 (then in South Africa), Somaeb started playing with local side Blue Waters which is one of the two local clubs that are standard in the Namibia Premier League. With the usual presence of South African scouts paying attention to any emerging Namibian talents, it was no surprise that Somaeb, by then established Namibian international, was signed by South African side Free State Stars where he played the following two seasons in the South African Premier Division. He later played with another South African club, Jomo Cosmos, in the 2016–17 National First Division, before returning to Namibia in 2017 joining his former club Blue Waters.

In summer 2018 he made his move to Europe and Serbian top-league side FK Zemun signed him on the last day of the 2018 summer transfer-window. He debuted for Zemun in the 2018–19 Serbian SuperLiga, on 1 September 2018, in a 7th round home victory against FK Rad by 1–0. 

On 19 February 2019, he joined Zambian giants Lusaka Dynamos Football Club.

International career
Somaeb has been a regular member of the Namibian national team since 2010.

International goals
Scores and results list Namibia's goal tally first.

References

External links 
 
 

1992 births
Living people
Sportspeople from Walvis Bay
Namibian men's footballers
Namibian expatriate footballers
Namibia international footballers
Association football midfielders
Blue Waters F.C. players
Namibia Premier League players
Free State Stars F.C. players
South African Premier Division players
Jomo Cosmos F.C. players
National First Division players
Expatriate soccer players in South Africa
Namibian expatriate sportspeople in South Africa
FK Zemun players
Serbian SuperLiga players
Expatriate footballers in Serbia
Expatriate footballers in Zambia
Lusaka Dynamos F.C. players
Namibia A' international footballers
2018 African Nations Championship players
Namibian expatriate sportspeople in Zambia
Namibian expatriate sportspeople in Serbia